Jack Edward Deaman (born 17 May 1993) is an English footballer.

Deaman began his career as a youngster with Wrexham, before joining Birmingham City in 2011. He spent time on loan at League Two club Cheltenham Town, without appearing for the first team, and moved on to Conference South club Eastbourne Borough after Birmingham released him at the end of the 2012–13 season. After a trial with Cheltenham in July 2014, he rejoined the club on a one-year contract. A defender who can also play in midfield, he made his senior debut in the 2014–15 League Cup. After Cheltenham's relegation in 2015, he spent the first half of the following season on loan to National League North club AFC Telford United before joining Basingstoke Town. He left at the end of the season to sign for National League North club Gloucester City. After a loan spell at Salford City, he spent the 2017–18 season with Hereford of the Southern League before returning to Gloucester City for 2018–19.

Career
Deaman was born in the London Borough of Camden. He played as a youngster for Wrexham, helping them reach the Football Association of Wales Youth Cup Final in 2010. After completing a two-year scholarship in 2011, he was offered a contract by the club but chose not to take it up. Instead, he joined Birmingham City on a one-year contract in August 2011.

With numerous defenders unavailable through illness, injury or ineligibility, Deaman was placed on standby for the fifth-round FA Cup replay at home to Chelsea in March 2012, but played no part in the match. At the end of the season, he was given a six-month contract extension, and was given a first-team squad number for 2012–13. His contract was extended to the end of the season, but he remained unable to force his way into Birmingham's matchday squad, and was made available for loan to gain experience. Ahead of the March 2013 loan transfer deadline, Deaman joined League Two club Cheltenham Town on a youth loan for the remainder of the season. His services as defensive cover were never called upon, and he returned to Birmingham where he was released in June 2013 when his contract expired.

After a trial with Stevenage, an extended trial with Torquay United interrupted by an ankle ligament injury sustained in training, and a rather briefer stay with Cambridge United, Deaman signed for Eastbourne Borough in November 2013. Over the remainder of the season, he regained full fitness and made 21 appearances in the Conference South, playing in a variety of positions – full-back and holding midfielder as well as his more usual centre back – which he felt benefited his all-round game.

Deaman signed a one-year contract with former club Cheltenham Town in July 2014 after a trial. He made his senior debut in the 2014–15 League Cup defeat at Championship club Brighton & Hove Albion on 12 August, playing the whole match having replaced rested captain Matt Taylor in the starting eleven. His second appearance, and home debut, was in the Football League Trophy first round win against Oxford United. Deputising for the suspended Troy Brown, Deaman made his Football League debut on 4 October, playing on the right of a back three against what the local newspaper's match report called "two of League Two's most dangerous front players", AFC Wimbledon's Adebayo Akinfenwa and Matt Tubbs. The match ended 1–1, Deaman was man of the match, and manager Mark Yates described his performance as outstanding. He kept his place in the starting eleven after Brown's return from suspension.

Prior to the 2015–16 campaign he joined National League North club AFC Telford United on a six-month loan deal. After Cheltenham confirmed in December that his contract would not be renewed, Deaman signed for Basingstoke Town until the end of the season.

Deaman moved on to Gloucester City of the National League North for the 2016–17 season, and spent a month on loan at Salford City before returning to his parent club where he became a regular in the side. He chose to leave at the end of the season to join Southern League club Hereford, where his one-year contract was not extended. Hereford's manager said that "for whatever reason it didn't work out for him here last season", and he rejoined Gloucester City, now of the National League South.

Career statistics

References

External links
 

1993 births
Living people
Footballers from the London Borough of Camden
English footballers
Association football defenders
Wrexham A.F.C. players
Birmingham City F.C. players
Cheltenham Town F.C. players
Eastbourne Borough F.C. players
AFC Telford United players
Basingstoke Town F.C. players
Gloucester City A.F.C. players
Salford City F.C. players
Hereford F.C. players
National League (English football) players
English Football League players
Southern Football League players